Brenda Wairimu (born 3 May 1989) is a Kenyan actress and model. She played Lulu Mali in the soap opera Mali.

Early life and education
Brenda Wairimu was born on 3 May 1989 and raised in Mombasa. She studied International Business Management at USIU-Africa and minor in Broadcast Media.

Career
Wairimu has appeared in several television series. In 2009, she made her debut to television when she was cast as one of the actresses in, Changing Times. She played Shareefah together with ensemble cast of Nice Githinji and Ian Mugoya. In 2011, she was cast as one of the lead characters in Kenya's soap opera, Mali. She played Lulu, a bubbly daughter of Gregory Mali and Mabel. She played alongside, Mkamzee Mwatela, Mumbi Maina and Daniel Peter. In 2012, Wairimu starred in the Pan-African drama, Shuga where she played Dala, a 22 year old communication student. She is the major actress on Monica playing ‘Monica’ role, a Showmax original that also airs on Maisha Magic East, which was released on 3 July 2018.

Filmography

Television

Films

References

External links
 

Kenyan television actresses
Kenyan female models
1989 births
Living people
21st-century Kenyan actresses